= Kwyro Lee =

Electrical engineer

Kwyro Lee is an electrical engineer at the Korea Advanced Institute of Science and Technology in Daejeon, South Korea. Lee was named a Fellow of the Institute of Electrical and Electronics Engineers (IEEE) in 2014 for his management and R&D efforts in semiconductor technology.
